Walldorf is a village and a former municipality the district of Schmalkalden-Meiningen in Thuringia, Germany. Since 1 January 2019, it is part of the town Meiningen.

Its most notable sight is a fortress church, Kirchenburg Walldorf, in the middle of town on a hill.  In April 2012 it was heavily damaged in a fire.

References

Former municipalities in Thuringia
Schmalkalden-Meiningen
Duchy of Saxe-Meiningen